Caroline Wozniacki was the defending champion, but chose not to participate this year.

Annika Beck won the tournament, defeating Barbora Záhlavová-Strýcová in the final, 6–2, 6–1.

Seeds

Draw

Finals

Top half

Bottom half

Qualifying

Seeds

Qualifiers

Qualifying draw

First qualifier

Second qualifier

Third qualifier

Fourth qualifier

External links 
 WTA tournament draws

BGL Luxembourg Open - Singles
2014 Singles
2014 in Luxembourgian tennis